"Hanafubuki" (Falling Cherry Blossoms) is Jun Shibata's 12th single and first with Victor Entertainment. It was released on April 19, 2006, and peaked at #8.

Track listing
Hanafubuki (花吹雪; Falling Cherry Blossoms)
Hitori shibai (ひとり芝居; One-Man Show)

Charts

References

2006 singles
Jun Shibata songs
2006 songs